This is a list of aircraft operators which are licensed by the Hellenic Civil Aviation Authority.

Scheduled airlines

Charter airlines

Cargo airlines

See also
 List of defunct airlines of Greece
 List of airports in Greece
 List of defunct airlines of Europe

References

External links
 Airlines in Greece

Airlines
Greece
Airlines
Greece